Covenham St Bartholomew is a village in the East Lindsey district of Lincolnshire, England. The southern part of the village adjoins Covenham St Mary; both villages are ecclesiastical parishes and part of the civil parish of Covenham.

The Prime Meridian passes to the west of Covenham St Bartholomew.

The Grade II listed Anglican parish church is dedicated to St Bartholomew. The church is mainly in Decorated style, and formerly cruciform in plan before losing its north transept. It has a low central bell-tower. On the floor of the church is a monumental brass with an effigy of Sir John Skypwyth, 1415. St Bartholomew's was repaired and re-seated in 1863 
The manor of Covenham was an endowment to Covenham Priory, which itself was given by William I to the abbey of St Carileph at Le Mans. In 1303 the priory became unprofitable and was sold to Kirkstead Abbey.

In the 19th century Covenham held Wesleyan, Primitive and Free Methodist chapels.

Other Grade II listed buildings within the village are Haith's Farm House and Mill House.

To the north-east of the village is a large reservoir with public access.

Covenham St Mary

The Covenham St Mary Grade II* listed parish church is dedicated to St Mary. It is entirely of Decorated style, but was considerably restored in 1901.

References

External links

"Covenham", Genuki.org.uk. Retrieved 19 July 2011.

Villages in Lincolnshire
Civil parishes in Lincolnshire
East Lindsey District